Foxton is a small village in County Durham, England. It is situated to the north-west of Stockton-on-Tees, near Stillington.

The origin of the place-name is from the Old English words fox  and denu meaning valley frequented by foxes.  The place-name appeared as Foxedene in c. 1170.

References

External links

Villages in County Durham
Sedgefield